Peter Schweri (* 20 June 1939 in Dietikon – 25 November 2016 in Zurich) was a Swiss artist, painter, illustrator, photographer and from 2008 on a music composer. He is a representative of the "Zurich constructivism".

Life and work 
Peter Schweri began his professional career as an apprentice draftsman in structural engineering from 1956 to 1959 at the Zurich College of Applied Sciences "Gewerbeschule Zürich". From 1959 to 1960, he also studied at the "Kunstgewerbeschule Zürich" where Hansjörg Mattmüller was his professor, mentor and, later, friend. From 1960 to 1961, Schweri studied graphic arts with Josef Müller-Brockmann. Due to Schweri's drawing and artistic talent, Paul Gredinger, one of the co-owners of the advertising agency GGK (Gerstner u. Kutter) hired him in 1962 to produce artwork to build GGK's cultural image. In the 1960s Schweri was extensively occupied with photography and film. He produced films for various clients in studios in Milan, Zurich and Paris. During this time, he also worked as an interior designer, produced an art film, (a forerunner of today's videoclips) for a disco in Milan and created a light show (a slide show with film footage), which was shown simultaneously on three screens in the nightclub Black Out in Zürich-Kloten. From 1968 to 1976, Peter Schweri lived and worked in the village of Carona (in the Ticino region of Switzerland) together with other artists who lived and worked there at the time. These artists included: Meret Oppenheim, David Weiss, Markus Raetz, Urs Lüthi, Christoph Wenger, Anton Bruhin among others. At that time, he was intensively devoted to drawing. Many of these drawings, using a variety of techniques, come from the time he spent in Carona and are in his estate. From 1974 to 1976 he organized and led the biological food store "Mr Natural" in Zurich. Mr. Natural was one of the first shops selling macrobiotic and biological foods in Switzerland and was well known far beyond the Swiss borders as a forerunner of today's organic food shops.

Beginning in 1975 he traveled to Greece, Egypt and the Sudan. Later, from 1977 to 1983, he traveled extensively to Greece, France and Egypt. In Greece he stayed for one year for wind-surfing, living out of a Mercedes D190 van, which he personally customized and continued to use for travel from 1984 to 1989.

Schweri was a profound thinker and an insightful researcher. In 1986, his knowledge about the existence of the "Universal Skeleton of Art" inspired him to develop the "ArtCode86". To create art compositions with the use of mathematical constraints: that was, what attracted and fascinated Schweri. The director of the ETH Zurich Graphic Collection, Paul Tanner, organized in the summer of 1994 a group exhibition «Kicking boxes billiard» at the ETH Zurich. This show gave Schweri the opportunity to become acquainted with the computer scientist Jürg Gutknecht prior to the exhibition. As a result of this contact, Schweri was invited to have an office at the ETH Zurich computer center, which he had from 1994 to 2001, the beginning of his blindness. Together with Jürg Gutknecht, he developed the system "Sakkara" for drafting "visual scores" for art compositions and both computer and internet-based presentations. The creation of the first dynamic constructive artwork was now possible and Schweri created a unique concept of art that he named "Dynamic Art", the interactive totem. After three years of intensive studies of the functioning of the internet he was recognized in 1997 as an internet expert at the Institute for Computer Systems at the ETH in Zürich. In the same year he created his first own internet art site. From 1997 until 2001 he further developed his "Dynamic Art" on the internet. Various evolutions allowed artistic shapes to fundamentally change every second and whose duration can last from a few seconds to several billion years, depending on the constellation of the totem.

Due to a Caldwell-Luc operation, which he had undergone without anesthesia in his childhood, his vision deteriorated steadily. In 1999 his vision was just 5% of normal. Nevertheless, he continued to work on all his art systems without help and in 2001 created a new, refined "Dynamic Art"-Internet-Site. In 2002 at the age of 63, Schweri was completely blind. He died in Zurich on 25 November 2016. The artist Stella Diess manages his estate.

Project Wirsindkunst 

In summer 2005 Schweri met "by chance" Stella Diess (birth name: Esther Bettina Diess) daughter of the actress Miriam Spoerri and the actor Karl Walter Diess. She is also the niece of Daniel Spoerri / Theophil Spoerri. There was an intense artistic collaboration and deep friendship between Peter Schweri and Stella Diess until Schweri's death in November 2016. From 2005 on the Schweri·Diess duo collaborated to create art under the label "Wirsindkunst" (WeAreArt), created a joint website of the same name, where they exhibit works of art in the virtual space of the internet. As a blind artist, it was Schweris wish to transfer his concept of "Art with mathematical constraints" (ArtCode86) to the tonal level and to create "music compositions with mathematical constraints". In 2008 Schweri·Diess set up a custom music studio in Schweri's apartment, where they created music under the label "Wirsindmusik" (WeAreMusic). They also created a joint website of the same name and presented their music compositions in the virtual space of the internet. Being totally blind Peter Schweri first had to learn the MusicWorkstation Yamaha Motif XS8 and Stella Diess had to learn the software for postproduction on the computer. A first CD with 6 compositions was released in 2009 as well as the CD "Motion – Peter Plays For Stella" (75'05, live played). In 2012 the CD "Metronmotion" was composed with 8 pieces of music. Peter Schweri played the piano, researched and refined his music compositions in much the same way as he researched and refined his paintings, as a visual artist before.

Exhibitions 
 1963 Exhibition at the Kunstgewerbeschule Zürich.
 1964 Exhibition with Hansjörg Mattmüller at the gallery Brönnimann in Berne.
 1966 Exhibition at the gallery Actuel in Berne and Geneva.
 1983 Opening Exhibition of the gallery Brigitta Rosenberg in Zurich.
 1983 Participation at the "Kunstszene Zürich"
 1986 Magic Group Exhibition with Anton Bruhin, Heinrich Louis Ney und René Wohlgemuth at the gallery Ursula Wiedenkeller in Zurich.
 1986 Participation at the "Kunstszene Zurich".
 1986, 1987 und 1988 Exhibition at the gallery Silvio R. Baviera in Zurich.
 1987, 1988 Permanent Exhibition at the own gallery Rotpunkt on Seilergraben in Zurich.
 1989 Private Exhibition for the 50th birthday of Peter Schweri in Zurich, sponsored by Marcel and Marcel.
 1990, 1991 Exhibitions at the gallery Brigitte Weiss in Zurich.
 1991 Group Exhibition with Bino Bühler and Heinz Keller at the Wengihof in Zurich.
 1991 Group Exhibition in the Helmhaus Zürich.
 1992, 1993 Group Exhibition at the Kunsthaus Oerlikon in Zurich.
 1994 Group Exhibition with Reiner Ruthenbeck, Imi Knoebel, Blinky Palermo, Peter Schweri, Helmut Federle, John Armleder, Jean-Luc Manz, Peter Fischli / David Weiss, Günther Förg, Gerwald Rockenschaub, Heimo Zobernig "Kicking boxes billiard" at the "Graphischen Sammlung der ETH" in Zurich.
 1994 Exhibition «Zürcher Künstler, ach was» at the Museum Baviera, Zurich.
 1995 Group Exhibition «10 Jahre Art Magazin» (10 years Art Magazine) in Zurich.
 1996 Solo Exhibition «Roll Over Malewich – The Flying Double Square» at the «Säulenhalle» of the ETH in Zurich. Lectures with big digital projection in the «Auditorium Maximum» of the ETH in Zurich on the issue of «Writing Art pictures».
 1999 Group Exhibition "Hansjörg Mattmüller – eine falsche Symmetrie" (with former students of Hansjörg Mattmüller, u. a. Simon Beer, Anton Bruhin, H. R. Giger, Urs Lüthi, Muda Mathis, Walter Pfeiffer, Christian Rothacher, Klaudia Schifferle, Peter Schweri, Costa Vece, David Weiss) in the museum/gallery Silvio R. Baviera, Zurich.
 1999 Group Exhibition PAGE, Zürich, "Pixel Art 01" Forum für Originalgrafik in Zürich (mit u. a. Cornelia Hesse-Honegger, Urs Lüthi, Vera Molnar, Yves Netzhammer, Martin Schwarz, Peter Schweri, Walter Pfeiffer)
 1999 Solo Exhibition at the Showcase Gallery, Zurich.
 2005 Participation at the Event 150 years ETH in Zurich
 2007 ETH/library Special Exhibition on the issue of "Alles ist Spiel! Unterhaltungsmathematik in historischer Perspektive" / Teilnahme mit dem ArtCode86. (Everything is game! Entertainment mathematics in historical perspective / Participation with the ArtCode86)
 2013 Helmhaus Zurich, Serge Stauffer / Kunst als Forschung (Art as research) – film material and drawings of Peter Schweri.
 2017 Helmhaus Zürich, «Keine Zeit – Kunst aus Zürich» – original paintings, drawings, ArtCode86, 16mm-film from 1969 of Peter Schweri in the «kleinen Helmhaus»
 2018 Peter Schweris Artsystems "DYNAMIC ART", as they were published on the internet from 1994 to 2012, can be shown again in 2018 after a complete reprogramming.
 2018 Group Exhibition at the gallery Weiss/Falk in Basel «CARONA» (with Anton Bruhin, Hermann Hesse, Matthyas Jenny, Urs Lüthi, Meret Oppenheim, Markus Raetz, Iwan Schumacher, Peter Schweri, David Weiss)
2021 Group Exhibition at Fabbrica Culturale Baviera, CH-6745 Giornico (with Sigmar Polke, Balthasar Burkhard, Hans Danuser, Luciano Castelli, Urs Lüthi, Manon, Dieter Meier, Walter Pfeiffer, Klaudia Schifferle, Kerim Seiler, Annelies Strba.
2023 Exhibition «MENTAL MASK» at Suns.Work gallery in Zurich (with Gregory Sugnaux)

Awards 
Paul Tanner, director of the Graphic Collection of the ETH in Zurich, and the artist David Weiss recommended Peter Schweri as a visual artist for the Zollikon 2003 art prize. On 4 May 2003 the Art Prize Zollikon 2003 of the Dr. K. and H. Hintermeister-Gyger-foundation endowed with 10'000 Franken, was presented to Peter Schweri as part of an official celebration in the community hall of Zollikon with a laudation of Hansjörg Mattmüller.

Selected bibliography 
 Lexikon der Schweiz XX. Jahrhundert. Verlag Huber & Co. AG. Frauenfeld 1958–1967.
 Silvio R. Baviera: Die Durchtunnelung der Normalität. Verlag Um die Ecke, Zürich 1996.
 Andreas Züst: Bekannte Bekannte 2. Edition Patrick Frey, Zürich 1996.
 Georg Radanowicz: Raum für Räume. The story of the first «Pop-Art-Happening» in Zürich, Zürich 2005.
 Werner Kieser: Die Entdeckung des Eisens. Stationen meines Lebens. Econ Verlag Berlin / 2008
 Aargauer Kunsthaus/Sammlung Andreas Züst: Memorizer. Der Sammler Andreas Züst. Scheidegger & Spiess, Zürich 2009.
 Silvio R. Baviera: Kult Zürich Aussersihl. Das andere Gesicht. Verlag Um die Ecke, Zürich 2010.
 Kunsthaus Chur: David Weiss. Exhibition in the Kunsthaus Chur. 2014. in the book on the exhibition are photographs of David Weiss and family made by Peter Schweri in 1979.
 Swiss Institute New York: David Weiss. Exhibition in the Swiss Institute New York. 2014. In the book on the exhibition are photographs of David Weiss and Family made by Peter Schweri in 1979.

References

External links 
 Official Website
  Swiss television, daily News of 13 July 1994
 arttv.ch

Swiss contemporary artists
Artists from Zürich
1939 births
2016 deaths
People from Dietikon District